HMS Diana was one of the four 32-gun Southampton-class fifth-rate frigates of the Royal Navy. She was launched in 1757. In 1760, at the Battle of Neuville she and HMS Vanguard pursued and sank two French frigates, Atlante, commanded by Jean Vauquelin, and Pomone; Diana took on board the important prisoners. Later, she served through the American Revolutionary War.

Career
In 1792 there was a civil in San Domingo with between the white and black inhabitants. Captain Thomas McNamara Russell of Diana, on a relief mission to the authorities on Saint-Domingue, received the intelligence that John Perkins, a mulatto (mixed-race) British former naval officer from Jamaica, was under arrest and due to be executed in Jérémie for supplying arms to the rebel slaves. Britain and France were not at war and Russell requested that the French release Perkins. The French authorities promised that they would, but didn't. After the exchange of numerous letters, Russell decided that the French were not going to release Perkins. Russell and Captain Nowell, of Ferret, decided that Nowell's first lieutenant, an officer named Godby, would go ashore and recover Perkins whilst the two ships remained offshore within cannon shot, ready to deploy a landing party if need be. Lieutenant Godby landed and after negotiations the French released Perkins.

Fate
The "Principal Officers and Commissioners of His Majesty's Navy" offered the hull of "Diana, Burthen 668 Tons" for sale at Deptford on 16 May 1793. The purchasers had to post a bond of £2000 that they would break her up in a limited time.

Citations and references 
Citations

References
 Robert Gardiner, The First Frigates, Conway Maritime Press, London 1992. .
 David Lyon, The Sailing Navy List, Conway Maritime Press, London 1993. .

1757 ships
Ships built on the River Thames
Fifth-rate frigates of the Royal Navy